Maharani Gina Narayan (born Georgina May Egan; 6 May 1930 – 14 January 2013), was a British-born Indian royal, the second wife of Jagaddipendra Narayan, the Maharaja of Cooch Behar.

Early life and background
Georgina May Egan was born on 6 May 1930, in London, the only child of police constable Arthur Egan and his wife, Evelyn (née Irons). Not much is known of her childhood and early life except that it was modest. She was educated at Purley County School for Girls. Her father died when she was young and her mother remarried.

Marriages 
Egan was married twice. Her first marriage was to businessman Douglas Fisher, to whom she was still married when she met her second husband, Jagaddipendra Narayan, the Maharaja of Cooch Behar, at a dinner party in 1956. Egan and Fisher divorced shortly afterward, and after a three-month romance, Egan married Jagaddipendra Narayan later that same year.

Egan and Narayan married privately in London in 1956. Their marriage was made public in January 1960, from which time she was recognised as the Maharani, along with the style of Her Highness.

Later life
After 1980, Maharani Gina Narayan relocated to Spain, where she died on 14 January 2013, aged 82.

References

1930 births
2013 deaths
Indian female royalty
People from Cooch Behar district
People from Purley, London